Luca Castelnuovo (born 29 January 1997) is a Swiss tennis player.

Castelnuovo has a career high ATP singles ranking of 543 achieved on 19 August 2019. He also has a career high doubles ranking of 321 achieved on 19 July 2019.

Castelnuovo has won 1 ATP Challenger doubles title at the 2021 Dutch Open with Manuel Guinard.

Tour titles

Doubles

References

External links
 
 

1997 births
Living people
Swiss male tennis players
People from Locarno
Sportspeople from Ticino